Sevvur is a small village in Sivagangai district in the state of Tamil Nadu. It is a Chettinad / Nagarathar village of "Mela Vattagai" group.

It is a semi arid place. There is a temple named roat Perumal koil. Rottu Perumal Kovil very famous for Purattasi Saturdays.
It comprises three roads. The main street is known as the shivan koil street as it has a shivan koil.
There is Subbiah Kovil in the small Medu near the school.

Villages in Sivaganga district